The 2011–12 RFU Championship was the third season (of the professionalised format) of the second tier of the English domestic rugby union competition, played between August 2011 and May 2012.  New teams to the division included Leeds Carnegie who were relegated from the Aviva Premiership 2010–11 and London Scottish who were promoted from 2010–11 National League 1.  The first stage was won by Bristol and the final by London Welsh who, after an appeal, won promotion to the Aviva Premiership 2012–13.  Esher were relegated to the 2012–13 National League 1.

On 8 May 2012 it was announced that only Bristol was eligible for promotion under the RFU's minimum standards criteria. They were subsequently beaten by the Cornish Pirates in the semi–finals who in turn lost to the eventual champions, London Welsh. London Welsh had announced on 14 May that they would meet the  RFU's eligibility test to play in the Premiership if they should win promotion and two days later announced they would play at the Kassam Stadium in Oxford if successful. On 23 May, the day of the first leg of the final, the RFU announced that London Welsh would not be eligible for promotion due to "various failures". The appeal by London Welsh was heard by an Independent Panel on 29 June who upheld it stating ″... that the Exiles should be promoted on the basis that they play their home games at Oxford's Kassam Stadium and that the club meet the minimum entry criteria to the league as imposed by the Professional Game Board.″ Chief Executive Officer of the RFU, Ian Richie, subsequently announced that there would be a full review of the Minimum Standard Criteria.

Participating teams

This season saw Leeds Carnegie back in the Championship following relegation from the Aviva Premiership during the 2010–11 season, as well as London Scottish, who won promotion to the Championship from the National League 1 during the same season.

Stage one

League table

League results 
The Home Team is listed on the left column.

Round 1

Round 2

Round 3

Round 4

Round 5

Round 6

Round 7

Round 8

Round 9

Round 10

Round 11

Round 12

Round 13

Round 14

Round 15

Round 16

Round 17

Round 18 

Postponed. Game rescheduled to 15 February 2012.

Round 19

Round 20 

Postponed. Game rescheduled to 22 February 2012.

Postponed. Game rescheduled to 22 February 2012.

Round 18 (Rescheduled Game)

Round 21

Round 20 (Rescheduled Games)

Round 22

Attendances 
A total of 251,542 people watched the 132 stage one matches to give an average of 1,903 per match. The highest attendance was 8,067 on Sunday, 8 January 2012 at the match between Bristol and Bedford Blues which Bristol won 26–6.

Stage two Play–offs

Group A (promotion)

Round 1

Round 2

Round 3

Round 4

Round 5

Round 6

Group A Attendances

Group B (promotion)

Round 1

Round 2

Round 3

Round 4

Round 5

Round 6

Group B Attendances

Group C (relegation)

Round 1

Round 2

Round 3

Round 4

Round 5

Round 6

Group C Attendances 

 (Adj) Refers to adjustment for the number of points awarded before the start of the play-offs.

Stage three

Going into the final stage, only one of the four semi–finalists Bristol, reportedly met the RFU's standards for promotion to the Premiership. According to some reports, London Welsh were also pursuing promotion, and announced on 14 May they would attempt a legal challenge to the Premiership's entry criteria if they won the play–offs. The Cornish Pirates could not meet the criteria due to deficiencies at their home ground at the Mennaye Field.

Semi–finals

 Cornish Pirates progressed to the Championship final, winning on aggregate 63-53.

 London Welsh progressed to the Championship final, winning on aggregate 30-27.

Final

 London Welsh win 66–41 on aggregate.

Total season attendances 

Includes playoff games.

Individual statistics 

Player stats include playoff games as well as regular season games.  Also note that points scorers includes tries as well as conversions, penalties and drop goals.  Statistics come from Stages 1, 2 and 3 of the Championship season.

Top points scorers

Top try scorers

RFU Dream Team XV 
The RFU Dream Team is picked by the coaches of the twelve championship teams with Robin Copeland (Rotherham Titans) voted in by seven of the twelve teams. The Cornish Pirates and Bristol both have four players in the team, whilst Gavin Cattle and Dave Ward (both Cornish Pirates) are in the team for the third season in a row. Mark Irish, James Merriman (both Bristol), Juan Pablo Socino (Nottingham) and Rob Cook (Cornish Pirates) are in the team for a second season.

15 Rob Cook (Cornish Pirates) 
14 Jack Tovey (Bristol)
13 Ian Thornley (Leeds Carnegie)
12 Juan Pablo Socino (Nottingham)
11 Josh Bassett (Bedford Blues)
10 Garry Law (Rotherham Titans)
 9 Gavin Cattle (Cornish Pirates)
 1 Mark Irish (Bristol)
 2 Dave Ward (Cornish Pirates)
 3 Aaron Liffchak (London Scottish)
 4 Roy Winters (Bristol)
 5 Ian Nimmo (Cornish Pirates)
 6 Robin Copeland (Rotherham Titans)
 7 James Merriman (Bristol)
 8 Semisi Taulava (Rotherham Titans)

Season records

Team
Largest home win — 42 pts
62 - 20 Nottingham at home to Moseley on 27 November 2011
Largest away win — 62 pts
65 - 3 Bristol away to Doncaster Knights on 9 March 2012
Most points scored — 65 pts
65 - 3 Bristol away to Doncaster Knights on 9 March 2012
Most tries in a match — 8 (x4)
Bedford Blues away to Esher on 10 September 2011
Nottingham at home to Moseley on 27 November 2011
Bristol away to Doncaster Knights on 9 March 2012
Plymouth Albion at home to Moseley on 21 April 2012
Most conversions in a match — 8
Nottingham at home to Moseley on 27 November 2011
Most penalties in a match — 7 (x2)
Bristol at home to Leeds Carnegie on 4 December 2011
Leeds Carnegie at home to Bedford Blues on 29 January 2012
Most drop goals in a match — 3
Leeds Carnegie at home to Rotherham Titans on 25 November 2011

Player
Most points in a match — 27
 James Arlidge for Nottingham at home to Moseley on 27 November 2011
Most tries in a match — 3 (x4)
 Bradley Hunt for Moseley away to Nottingham on 27 November 2011
 Joshua Bassett for Bedford Blues at home to London Scottish on 14 January 2012
 George Watkins for Bristol at home to Doncaster Knights on 24 February 2012
 Nicholas Scott for London Welsh away to Doncaster Knights on 31 March 2012
Most conversions in a match — 8
 James Arlidge for Nottingham at home to Moseley on 27 November 2011
Most penalties in a match —  7 (x2)
 Tristan Roberts for Bristol at home to Leeds Carnegie on 4 December 2011
 Thomas Bell for Leeds Carnegie at home to Bedford Blues on 29 January 2012
Most drop goals in a match —  3
 Joe Ford for Leeds Carnegie at home to Rotherham Titans on 25 November 2011

Attendances
Highest — 12,024 
Worcester Warriors at home to Cornish Pirates on 18 May 2011
Lowest — 317 
Birmingham & Solihull at home to Doncaster Knights on 9 January 2011
Highest Average Attendance — 6,524
Worcester Warriors
Lowest Average Attendance — 590
Birmingham & Solihull

See also
 2011–12 British and Irish Cup
 2011–12 Cornish Pirates RFC season

References

 
2011–12 in English rugby union leagues
2011-12